may refer to:

 On verra, a 1998 album by Jocelyne Labylle
 "On verra", a 1977 song by Michaël Raitner
 "On verra ça", a 2003 song by Orchestra Baobab
 "On verra" (Nekfeu song), a 2015 song by Nekfeu